The Furness Baronetcy, of Tunstall Grange in the borough of West Hartlepool in the County of Durham, is a title in the Baronetage of the United Kingdom. It was created on 18 June 1913 for Stephen Furness. He was Chairman of Furness, Withy and Co, and also represented Hartlepool in the House of Commons as a Liberal. The third Baronet is an artist (as Robin Furness).

Christopher Furness, 1st Baron Furness, was the uncle of the first Baronet.

Furness baronets, of Tunstall Grange (1913)

Sir Stephen Wilson Furness, 1st Baronet (1872–1914)
Sir Christopher Furness, 2nd Baronet (1900–1974)
Sir Stephen Robert Furness, 3rd Baronet (born 1933)

Notes

References
Kidd, Charles, Williamson, David (editors). Debrett's Peerage and Baronetage (1990 edition). New York: St Martin's Press, 1990.

External links
Biography of Sir Stephen Furness, 1st Baronet

Furness